The Fujifilm FinePix S200EXR (also known as S205EXR) is a digital bridge camera from Fujifilm introduced in July 2009.

It features a 12 Megapixel, 1/1.6" EXR sensor, Fujifilm's 9th generation of Super CCD, first seen in F200EXR, and uses same body and lens as FinePix S100fs.

The main features of the EXR sensor is the new color filter, different from largely used Bayer filter, and pixel binning capability, which it uses to produce higher dynamic range and better sensitivity. Due to the nature of EXR technology, high sensitivity (SN) and high dynamic range (DR) modes produce 6 Megapixel resolution images.

The S200EXR has the shape and size to a small DSLR, but with a fixed lens.  However, unlike a DSLR, the S200EXR features an 0.2",200,000 dot FLCD color electronic viewfinder.  Framerate of the viewfinder can be adjust in the menu system from 30fps to 50fps (half pressed shutter only).  The rear LCD screen of the S200EXR is a conventional non-rotating, non-articulating 2.7" 230,000 dot panel.

The S200EXR's controls are very similar to that of an actual DSLR with buttons for exposure compensation, ISO, focus and metering modes, and knobs for exposure modes and a thumb wheel.  The S200EXR lost the PC sync socket of the S100FS, but keeps the hot shoe.

The lens used on the Fujifilm S200EXR is a variable aperture zoom.  Its widest focal length is 30.5mm and zooms up to 436mm (135 format).  It is the same lens that was on the Fujifilm S100FS.  However, because of the smaller sensor size of the S200EXR (1/1.6" vs 2/3"), its focal length has changed.  Its widest aperture is F2.8 and closes down to F5.3 at its longest focal length.  Unlike other bridge cameras at the time, the S200EXR featured a manual twist zoom lens similar to that of an actual DSLR.  The lens also features Optical Image Stabilization (estimated 2-stop effectiveness).  The lens features a fly-by-wire focus ring which is situated closest to the camera's body.  It can be used in Manual focus mode with the assist of an focus scale in the viewfinder.  The lens can focus as close as 1 cm in Super Macro Mode.

The S200EXR is powered by a proprietary lithium ion battery which is supplied with the camera as well as a neck strap and lens cap.  Optional accessories were a bayonet type lens hood with an opening for turning polarized filters, an Ac power adapter, and remote release.

Movie mode

The S200EXR can record video at an maximum resolution of 640x480 at 30fps with mono sound in .avi format.  Focus and zoom can be adjusted whilst recording.  The camera can record as long as there is memory available and battery power.

Quirks

The owners manual states that the camera can be awakened from sleep by pressing the "play" button for about a second.  This is false.  Annoyingly, the camera must be turned off and then on again.

The EXR sensor in the S200EXR, as well as other EXR sensor cameras exhibit strange artifacts in 12MP High Resolution Priority mode.  This is due to having two of the same color filters next to each other.

CCD-RAW files that were shot in EXR-DR Priority and EXR-SN Priority modes are extremely large for a 6 megapixel output.  Some file sizes exceed 20MB.  This is due to having two separate images recorded onto a single file.  An example would be a highlight image and the shadow image recoded onto the same raw file that was shot in EXR-DR mode.  Other reasons may be due to the Super CCD structure and interpolation needed to make the honeycomb layout into a normal square layout.

See also
Fujifilm FinePix S-series

References

External links
 Fujifilm S200EXR on Fujifilm global website
 Fujifilm EXR page on Fujifilm global website
 FinePix 200EXR on DPReview
 S200EXR Specifications of fujifilm.com

S200EXR
Bridge digital cameras